Charles Henry Crandall (June 19, 1858 – March 23, 1923) was an American author and poet. He was a noted farmer and had become active in real estate having amassed  in Stamford by 1910. Crandall was a member of the American Institute of Arts, Science and Letters, a council member of the Stamford Rural Association, and a member of the Stamford Historical Society.

Early life
Crandall's father served in various capacities as a public official within the state of New York. These included as a member of the legislature, assistant assessor, internal revenue collector, money order clerk in the post office and a number of positions in the New York Custom House. Crandall attended Greenwich Academy, but did not matriculate from an institution of higher learning. After spending the first seventeen years of his life as a farmer, he went into the mercantile business for five years, then began a literary career.

Literary accomplishments
After working as a reporter for the New York Tribune and the New York Globe, he moved to Connecticut in 1886 as a result of ill health.  He called his tenure with New York with the roles of reporter, correspondent and editor, his "university years". In 1890 he published "Representative Sonnets by American Poets" with an exhaustive essay on the sonnet. Thereafter, he published a number of volumes of his own works from collections previously printed in newspapers and magazines in America. These publications included The Century Magazine, Harper's, Atlantic Monthly, The Outlook (New York), Independent, Critic, Lippincott's Monthly Magazine, North American Review, and Outing, along with others. His early collections often had a rural theme and his poems and prose would often involve farming life, as he became a serious farmer. A 1914 article in Guide to Nature Magazine gave him the moniker "Crandall - the Farmer-Poet".

Patriot
He had four sons who served in World War I, one of which, Robert Ferguson Crandall, died in combat in France. Despite this loss, he remained a stalwart patriot and in 1918 published Liberty Illumined and Songs for the Boys in Khaki. The Stamford Historical Society has 109 of his poems, stories and essays in either typewritten or long-hand form.

Later life
In 1923, feeling despondent over increasingly ill health after penning a thank you note to his housekeeper, he committed suicide in his barn, with a pistol.

Publications
 1883 The Season
 1890 Representative Sonnets by American Poets
 1893 Wayside Music
 1898 The Chords of Life
 1899 Songs behind the Lines
 1909 Songs from Sky Meadows
 1918 Liberty Illumined
 1918 Songs for the Boys in Khaki

References

External links
 
 
 Representative Sonnets by American Poets in Google digitized format from Princeton University
 Wayside Music in Google digitized format from New York Public Library
 The Chords of Life Google digitized format from University of California

1858 births
1923 suicides
American reporters and correspondents
Writers from Stamford, Connecticut
People from Greenwich (town), New York
Suicides by firearm in Connecticut
American male poets
American male non-fiction writers